The Trident Society is a secret society at Duke University. The Trident Society is rumored to have inherited the mission of The Order of the Red Friars and The Order of the White Duchy. The Society seeks to promote dedication and loyalty to Duke University while promoting the goals of the university, and to reward students for merit and achievement. The Trident Society is the most secretive, and largely thought of as the most prestigious of the secret societies at Duke University.

History
The origin of the group remains shrouded in mystery. Some believe the group came about in the wake of the dissolution of the Order of the Red Friars and Order of the White Duchy. The Red Friars were founded in 1913 at Trinity College (which eventually became Duke University). Members of the Red Friars included nationally recognized individuals such as Richard Nixon, 37th President of the United States, and Raymond Nasher, American businessman and noted art collector, as well as high-level university administrators, mainly Presidents and Deans, such as Arthur Hollis Edens, Rex Adams, William Wannamaker, Herbert Herring, Robert Flowers, and Tallman Trask.

Only recently has it come to light that "TS" stands for "Trident Society." The men and women of the society maintain a strict silence about their membership and the group's mission. A November 2007 edition of the Rival Magazine explained the group's philosophy. According to a "cryptic letter sealed with wax," the society is "rooted in ideals that stretch back to the university's founding." The letter continued:

"Our founders recognized that similar institutions existed at other top universities (Skull and Bones at Yale, The Sevens at the University of Virginia, Quill and Dagger at Cornell) and saw a void to fill at Duke."

As such, on-campus members are not typically public about their membership in the Society, and do not join for recognition. Members of the society are or were recipients of the Rhodes Scholarship, Marshall Scholarship, Truman Scholarship, Angier B. Duke Scholarship, Benjamin Newton Duke Scholarship, players for Coach Mike Krzyzewski, and leaders of the largest or most influential campus organizations, historically within Student Government, the University Union, The Chronicle (University Newspaper), and the Interfraternity Council. The Trident Society is believed to have multiple members sitting on the Duke University Board of Trustees, with both alumni and active members involved in workings of the university. The secrecy around this group drove Samantha Lachman to investigate the society in the Duke Chronicle. Her subsequent article, "Trasked with Secrecy," revealed information including the names of several prominent members, that the group places red roses and white carnations at the base of the James Buchanan Duke statue as their calling card, and that the group maintains uninhibited access to the Duke Chapel for their Initiation Rites.

Activities
It is believed that each year, the Trident Society welcomes a select few students into the group, chosen by the current members of the society. The exact number of students chosen for this honor varies by report, though generally seems to fall between five and ten. The details of the initiation process are largely unknown, though it is generally believed that campus leaders and notable scholars are often selected each semester. The process of doing so is referred to as "tapping" students for the society. While other societies at Duke include more public demonstrations, the Trident Society largely works behind the scenes, and the extent of their of power and influence is largely unknown. A 2008 Story in the Student Newspaper claims that members of the secret society would often develop strong relationships with notable administrators and would use this influence to enact change across the campus, unknown to the general population.

The Trident Society annually writes and frames a letter of recognition to select faculty and staff at the university who exceptionally impact the lives of students, maintains support for undergraduate scholarships, and makes philanthropic gifts. The financial backing of the society is largely unknown. The organization also writes an annual letter, which is usually found on the steps of Lilly Library or Marketplace during the first few weeks of every school year, welcoming first-year students to the campus. Members of the society are believed to be granted unfettered access to the Duke Chapel throughout the year.

Signs of the Trident Society appear frequently on Duke's campus, and such notes are sometimes accompanied by a rose. Before a 2015 restoration of the Duke University Chapel, the TS mark was integrated into a university plaque. References to the "TS" letters can be found on plaques, monuments, and statues throughout the campus, and it is even believed that symbols of the society are referenced in the Alma Mater.

Outside of references to the society letters, there are thought to exist multiple symbols and tokens of the society across campus. One of these is the "Charley Bell," located within Kilgo quad, which was a gift from former society members which is believed to be controlled exclusively by the society. Details about the reasons for the use of the Bell remain unknown. A student report exposed that the Bell supposedly rings seven times for each of the graduating seven seniors in the society on the first Thursday of May, though it is unclear if this routinely still occurs. Outside of this, references to the society often include a red rose and a trident.

References

External links
 November 2007 The Rival Magazine, November 2007
  Order of the White Duchy Records, 1925-1968 University Archives, Duke University
 .
 Glenn, "Trident Society,". Blogger
 Ellen Mielke, "Secret Societies: Do They Still Haunt the Campus?" Duke University Chronicle (October 10, 2000). Secret societies: Do they still haunt the campus? - Undefined Section
 Emily Almas, "Behind the Hood," Duke University Towerview (December 1, 2004). Behind the hood - Towerview
 Duke Chronicle, for information on Duke's secret societies
 Controversy over former Duke Chronicle Editor in Chief and Member of the Red Friars

Duke University
Collegiate secret societies
Student organizations established in 1913